Meng Gaofeng (孟高峰, born December 9, 1996) is a Chinese kickboxer.

As of January 2022 he was the #8 ranked Featherweight kickboxer in the world by Combat Press.

Career

On December 7, 2019, Meng made his Glory promotion debut at Glory 73: Shenzhen in a Featherweight tournament. In the semi-finals he beat Masaya Kubo by unanimous decision. In the final he lost to River Daz by split decision.
On December 25, Gaofeng challenged Tang Yao at the Faith Fighting Championships 32 event for the Faith Fight China Professional League -67 kg title. He lost by decision.

On August 28, 2020, Meng faced Pan Jiayun in the final of the 2020  Wu Lin Feng China tournament. He won the fight by TKO in the first round scoring three knockdowns less than two minutes into the bout to capture the vacant IPCC China and Wu Lin Feng China -65 kg titles.

On January 1, 2022, Meng Gaofeng challenged Wang Pengfei for the Wu Lin Feng World -65 kg title. He won the fight by decision after five rounds.

Gaofeng took part in a one-day eight-man Wu Lin Feng World -67 kg tournament, which was held at Wu Lin Feng 2023: Chinese New Year on February 4, 2023. He faced Diego Freitas in the quarterfinals. Although he was able to beat Freitas by unanimous decision, Gaofeng lost the semifinal bout against Zhou Jiaqiang by decision.

Titles and accomplishments

Amateur
 2019 China Kickboxing Championships -67 kg 

Professional
Wu Lin Feng
 2020 Wu Lin Feng China -65 kg Champion
 2021 Wu Lin Feng World -65 kg Champion
International Professional Combat Council
 2020 IPCC China -65 kg Champion

Fight record

|-  style="background:#fbb;"
| 2023-02-04 || Loss || align=left| Zhou Jiaqiang || Wu Lin Feng 2023: Chinese New Year, 67kg World Tournament Semi Final || Tangshan, China || Decision || 3||3:00 

|-  style="background:#cfc;"
| 2023-02-04 || Win|| align=left| Diego Freitas || Wu Lin Feng 2023: Chinese New Year, 67kg World Tournament Quarter Final || Tangshan, China || Decision (Unanimous) || 3 || 3:00 

|-  style="background:#cfc;"
| 2022-09-24 || Win || align=left| Weng Wei ||  Wu Lin Feng 531|| Zhengzhou, China || Decision (Unanimous) || 3 || 3:00

|-  style="background:#fbb;"
| 2022-07-09 || Loss || align=left| Jia Aoqi || Wu Lin Feng x Huya Kung Fu Carnival 6|| Zhengzhou, China || Decision (Unanimous) || 3 ||3:00

|-  style="background:#cfc;"
| 2022-01-01 || Win || align=left| Wang Pengfei || Wu Lin Feng 527|| Tangshan, China || Decision (Unanimous)|| 5 || 3:00
|-  
! style=background:white colspan=9 |

|-  style="background:#cfc;"
| 2021-11-27 ||Win || align=left| Zhao Chuanlin || Wu Lin Feng 2021: World Contender League 7th Stage Contender League Final || Zhengzhou, China || Decision (Unanimous) || 3 ||3:00

|-  style="background:#cfc;"
| 2021-09-30 || Win || align=left| Kong Dexiang	|| Wu Lin Feng 2021: World Contender League 6th Stage || Zhengzhou, China || Decision (Unanimous)|| 3 ||3:00

|-  style="background:#cfc;"
| 2021-05-29 || Win || align=left| Shang Xifeng || Wu Lin Feng 2021: World Contender League 4th Stage || Zhengzhou, China || Decision (Unanimous)|| 3 ||3:00

|-  style="text-align:center; background:#cfc;"
| 2021-03-27 || Win || align=left| Bai Lishuai || Wu Lin Feng 2021: World Contender League 1st Stage || China || Decision (Unanimous) || 3 || 3:00

|-  style="background:#cfc;"
| 2020-11-28 || Win|| align=left| Pan Jiayun || Wu Lin Feng 2020: China 70kg Championship Tournament || Zhengzhou, China || Decision || 3 || 3:00

|-  style="background:#cfc;"
| 2020-08-29 || Win|| align=left| Pan Jiayun || Wu Lin Feng 2020: China New Kings Tournament Final || Zhengzhou, China || TKO (3 Knockdowns)|| 1 || 1:48
|-  
! style=background:white colspan=9 |

|-  style="text-align:center; background:#cfc;"
| 2020-08-03 || Win || align=left| Zhao Chuanlin || Wu Lin Feng 2020: King's Super Cup 4th Group Stage, China Tournament Semi Final || Zhengzhou, China || Decision || 3 || 3:00

|-  style="background:#fbb;"
| 2020-07-05 || Loss || align=left| Pan Jiayun || Wu Lin Feng 2020: King's Super Cup 3rd Group Stage || Zhengzhou, China || Decision || 3 || 3:00

|-  style="text-align:center; background:#cfc;"
| 2020-06-13 || Win || align=left| Kong Dexiang || Wu Lin Feng 2020: King's Super Cup 2nd Group Stage || Zhengzhou, China || Decision || 3 || 3:00

|-  style="background:#CCFFCC;"
| 2020-05-15 || Win ||align=left| Bai Lishuai || Wu Lin Feng 2020: King's Super Cup 1st Group Stage|| Zhengzhou, China || Decision || 3 || 3:00

|-  style="background:#fbb;"
| 2019-12-25 || Loss || align=left| Tang Yao|| Faith Fighting Championships 32 || Shenzhen, China || Decision || 3 || 3:00
|-  
! style=background:white colspan=9 |

|-  style="background:#fbb;"
| 2019-12-07 || Loss || align=left| River Daz || Glory 73: Shenzhen, Featherweight Tournament Final || Shenzhen, China || Decision (Split) || 3 || 3:00

|-  style="background:#cfc;"
| 2019-12-07 || Win || align=left| Masaya Kubo|| Glory 73: Shenzhen, Featherweight Tournament Semi-Finals || Shenzhen, China || Decision (Unanimous) || 3 || 3:00

|-  style="background:#cfc;"
| 2019-10-26 || Win || align=left| Feng Lei|| Faith Fighting Championships 31 || Xi'an, China || Decision || 3 || 3:00

|-  style="background:#cfc;"
| 2019-09-20 || Win || align=left| Xu Zhongyuan|| Faith Fighting Championships 29 || Shijiazhuang, China || Decision || 3 || 3:00

|-  style="background:#cfc;"
| 2019-08-18 || Win || align=left| Zhou Jiaqiang|| Faith Fighting Championships 27 || Shijiazhuang, China || Decision || 3 || 3:00

|-  style="background:#cfc;"
| 2019-06-22 || Win || align=left| Zhang Shuai|| Faith Fighting Championships 25 || Shijiazhuang, China || Decision || 3 || 3:00

|-  style="background:#cfc;"
| 2019-06-06 || Win || align=left| Wang Yuanze|| Kunlun Combat Professional League || China || TKO||  ||

|-  style="background:#cfc;"
| 2018-12-29 || Win || align=left| You Long || Kunlun Combat Professional League || China || TKO||  ||

|-  style="background:#fbb;"
| 2018-12-15 || Loss|| align=left| Zhang Shuai|| Faith Fighting Championships 15 || Shijiazhuang, China || Decision || 3 || 3:00

|-  style="background:#fbb;"
| 2018-11-15 || Loss|| align=left| Wang Wei || Faith Fighting Championships 14 || Shenzhen, China || Decision || 3 || 3:00

|-  style="background:#cfc;"
| 2018-09-01 || Win || align=left| Li Qiyu || Faith Fighting Championships 12 || Shenzhen, China || Decision || 3 || 3:00

|-  style="background:#cfc;"
| 2018-07-28 || Win || align=left| Xu Zhongyuan || Faith Fighting Championships 10 || Shenzhen, China || KO (Right Cross)|| 2 || 2:30

|-  style="background:#cfc;"
| 2018-05-05 || Win || align=left| Meng Kang || Wu Lin Feng || Nanyang, China || Decision || 3 || 3:00

|-  style="background:#cfc;"
| 2018-05-05 || Win || align=left| Li Shibo || Wu Lin Feng || Nanyang, China || Decision || 3 || 3:00

|-  style="background:#cfc;"
| 2018-01-27 || Win || align=left| Hussein || Long Jue Liangjian || Liaoyang, China || Decision || 3 || 3:00

|-  style="background:#fbb;"
| 2017-12-12 || Loss || align=left| Wang Jin || Wu Lin Feng || China || Decision || 3 || 3:00
|-  
! style=background:white colspan=9 |

|-  style="background:#cfc;"
| 2017-10-18 || Win || align=left| Zhang Songshan ||Wu Lin Feng New Generation || China || TKO||  ||

|-  style="background:#cfc;"
| 2017-10-18 || Win || align=left| Zhang Xiangfei ||Wu Lin Feng New Generation || China || TKO||  ||

|-  style="background:#fbb;"
| 2017-07-25 || Loss || align=left| Liu Qiliang || Wu Lin Feng New Generation || China || Decision || 3 || 3:00

|-  style="background:#cfc;"
| 2017-05-05 || Win || align=left| Wang Jingwei ||Wu Lin Feng New Generation || China || TKO||  ||

|-  style="background:#cfc;"
| 2017-05-05 || Win || align=left| Liu Laguan ||Wu Lin Feng New Generation || China || Decision || 3 || 3:00

|-  style="background:#fbb;"
| 2017-03-25 || Loss || align=left| Liu Qiliang || Wu Lin Feng New Generation || Rizhao, China || Decision || 3 || 3:00

|-
| colspan=9 | Legend:    

|-  style="background:#cfc;"
| 2019-04-03 || Win || align=left| Tang Yao || China Kickboxing Championships, Final || China || Decision ||  || 
|-  
! style=background:white colspan=9 |
|-
| colspan=9 | Legend:

Mixed martial arts record

|-
|Loss
|align=center|0-1
| Ha Leng Bie Ke
|Submission (Rear naked choke)
|Chinese MMA Super League
|
|align=center|2
|align=center|1:53
|China
|

References

External links
Glory profile

Chinese male kickboxers
1996 births
Living people
Sportspeople from Henan
People from Zhoukou